Hans-Werner Wohlers (11 December 1933 – 24 July 2011) was a German boxer. He competed in the men's lightweight event at the 1952 Summer Olympics.

References

1933 births
2011 deaths
German male boxers
Olympic boxers of Germany
Boxers at the 1952 Summer Olympics
Sportspeople from Hamburg
Lightweight boxers